Jorge Brauer (19 November 1913 – 4 December 1992) was an Argentine sailor. He competed at the 1948 Summer Olympics and the 1952 Summer Olympics. He was second at the Snipe Worlds in 1947.

References

External links
 

1913 births
1992 deaths
Argentine male sailors (sport)
Olympic sailors of Argentina
Sailors at the 1948 Summer Olympics – Firefly
Sailors at the 1952 Summer Olympics – Star
Sportspeople from Montevideo
Medalists at the 1951 Pan American Games
Sailors at the 1951 Pan American Games
Pan American Games silver medalists for Argentina
Pan American Games medalists in sailing
Snipe class sailors